Elections were held in the Australian state of Victoria on Saturday 21 June 1952 to elect 17 of the 34 members of the state's Legislative Council for six year terms. MLCs were elected in single-member provinces using preferential voting.

The election was the first following the abolition of property qualifications for voting in the Legislative Council, and saw a large increase in the number of Labor MLCs.

Results

Legislative Council

|}

Retiring Members

Labor
William Beckett MLC (Melbourne)
Pat Kennelly MLC (Melbourne West)

Liberal and Country
Sir William Angliss MLC (Southern)
Sir Frank Beaurepaire MLC (Monash)
Allan McDonald MLC (South Western)

Candidates
Sitting members are shown in bold text. Successful candidates are highlighted in the relevant colour. Where there is possible confusion, an asterisk (*) is also used.

Results by province

Ballarat

Bendigo

Doutta Galla

East Yarra

Gippsland

Higinbotham

Melbourne

Melbourne North

Melbourne West

Monash

Northern

North-Eastern

North-Western

Southern

 Two party preferred vote was estimated.

South-Eastern

 Cyril Isaac lost his endorsement as a member of the LCP and contested the election as an Independent.

South Western

 Two party preferred vote was estimated.

Western

 Two party preferred vote was estimated.

See also
1952 Victorian state election

References

1952 elections in Australia
Elections in Victoria (Australia)
Results of Victorian state elections
1950s in Victoria (Australia)
June 1952 events in Australia